Stukas Over Disneyland is the third studio album by punk rock band The Dickies, released in 1983.

The album includes covers of The Quick's "Pretty Please Me" and Led Zeppelin's "Communication Breakdown." The cover art illustrates the album's title by showing a Stuka dive bomber over the head of Mickey Mouse.

Critical reception
Reviewer Steve Spinali of Maximum Rocknroll commented positively on the original 1984 release with "The DICKIES' first vinyl in almost four years ranks up there near their previous funnypunk triumphs. Most of the eight songs here veer toward amphetamine pop, with irresistible layered choruses to boot, but the highlights include the poppish 'Rosemary,' 'She's a Hunchback,' and an incredibly fast cover of LED ZEP's 'Communication Breakdown.' Buoyant and entertaining as hell!"

Track listing

Personnel 

Leonard Graves Phillips - Lead vocals on all tracks
Stan Lee - Guitar on all tracks
Billy Club - Bass on tracks 1-4 (original issue) and tracks 5-7 (reissue)
Laurie Buhne - Bass and vocals on tracks 5-8 (original issue)
Scott Sindon - Guitar and vocals on tracks 1-4 (original issue)
Steve Hufsteter - Guitar on tracks 6-8 (original issue)
Chuck Wagon - Drums on tracks 1, 2 and 4 (original issue); guitar on tracks 5-7 (reissue)
Karlos Kaballero - Drums on track 3  (original issue) and tracks 5-7 (reissue)
Jerry Angel - Drums on tracks 5-8 (original issue)

References

The Dickies albums
1983 albums
Albums produced by Ed Stasium